Timothy Stephens is an English karateka. He is the winner of multiple European Karate Championships and World Karate Championships Karate medals. In 2012 he was convicted of possession of child pornography.

References

English male karateka
Living people
English people convicted of child pornography offences
Prisoners and detainees of England and Wales
1962 births